In mathematics, a tall cardinal is a large cardinal κ that is θ-tall for all ordinals θ, where a cardinal is called θ-tall if there is an elementary embedding j : V → M with critical point κ such that j(κ) > θ and Mκ ⊆ M.

Tall cardinals are equiconsistent with strong cardinals.

References

Large cardinals